Arthur Mason (22 August 1909 – 17 November 1971) was an Australian rules footballer who played for the North Melbourne Football Club in the Victorian Football League (VFL).

Notes

External links 

1909 births
1971 deaths
Australian rules footballers from Victoria (Australia)
North Melbourne Football Club players